Charlotte Bellamy (born 19 March 1973) is an English actress. She is known for her long-running role as Laurel Thomas in the ITV soap opera Emmerdale. Her other television roles include Sue Taylor in EastEnders (1997) and Harriet Potter in The Broker's Man (1998), before joining Emmerdale in 2002. She won the British Soap Award for Best Actress in 2017.

Acting career
In 1994 the bill episode 46 series 10 No where to run Character name Elaine 1996, she played the role of Jamie Merrick in A Touch of Frost : "Deep Waters".
In 1997 she played the role of the religious fanatic, Sue Taylor, in BBC's EastEnders, and in 1998 was Cissie in a London Weekend Television production of Tess of the D'Urbervilles, but she is best known for her part in ITV's Emmerdale as Laurel Thomas.

Personal life
Bellamy had her first child, Sunnie, in 2004; this was followed by her second child, Herbie, in 2007. It was announced in 2009 that she was expecting her third child in October 2009 and that she would return to Emmerdale in 2010.

Awards and nominations
British Soap Awards 2008  -  'Best Actress'  - nominated
British Soap Awards 2008  -  'Best Dramatic Performance'  - nominated
TV Quick & TV Choice Awards 2008  -  'Best Soap Actress'  - won
National Television Awards 2008  -  'Best Serial Drama Performance'  - nominated
British Soap Awards 2010 -  'Best Actress'  - nominated
TV Choice Awards 2010 -  'Best Soap Actress'  - nominated
British Soap Awards 2017 - 'Best Actress' - won
British Soap Awards 2017 - 'Best Female Dramatic Performance' - nominated
British Soap Awards 2017 - 'Best On-Screen Partnership' (with John Middleton) - nominated

References

External links
 

Alumni of Middlesex University
1973 births
Living people
English television actresses
People from Dover, Kent
Actresses from Kent
English soap opera actresses